Wheatland High School may refer to:

 Wheatland High School (California), in Wheatland, California
 Wheatland High School, in Grainfield, Kansas
 Wheatland High School (Missouri), in Wheatland, Missouri
 Wheatland High School (Wyoming), in Wheatland, Wyoming

See also
 Calamus–Wheatland High School, in Wheatland, Iowa